The 1959 New Zealand gallantry awards were announced via a special honours list dated 29 June 1959, and recognised one member of the New Zealand military forces for distinguished service and devotion to duty during the Malayan Emergency.

Mentioned in despatches
 Flight Lieutenant Arthur David Malcolm Winkelmann – Royal New Zealand Air Force; of Hamilton.

References

Gallantry awards
New Zealand gallantry awards